The Maghalashvili (Magalashvili) or Maghaladze (Magaladze, მაღალაძე) is a Georgian noble family; according to Cyril Toumanoff, an offshoot of the medieval house of Mkhargrdzeli. The surname Maghalashvili is a combination of Maghala (which means tall or "Great" in Greek language) and shvili (meaning "son" in Georgian language).

Bibiluridze
According to Georgian genealogic tradition of Prince Ioann (1768–1830), the Maghalashvili came from Imereti (western Georgia) to Kartli (central Georgia) in 1415, in the reign of Alexander I of Georgia, who granted them an estate at the village of Tsinarekhi in Shida Kartli. An 18th century Georgian Orthodox Christian monastery, named the Maghalashvili or Maghalaanti Castle complex, was also built in their name, located on a hill outside of Tsinarekhi.

By the end of the 17th century, the family had been bestowed with the hereditary office of Mayors of the Palace (Georgian: სახლთუხუცესი, saxlt'-uxuc'esi) of the Church of Georgia. In 1701, the Georgian king Erekle I (Nazar Alī Khān) elevated the Maghalashvili to a princely rank or tavadi. After Russian annexation of Georgia, the family was incorporated among the princely nobility (knyaz Magalov) of the empire in 1825.

Tsinarekhi and the Maghalashvili monastery 
in the reign of Alexander I of Georgia the Maghalashvilis were granted an estate in the village of Tsinarekhi located in the Shida Kartli region of Georgia (country). The family was given several pieces of farmland property in the village. in 1716 the construction of the Maghalshvili castle complex or Maghalashvili monastery began, the monastery was built as a Georgian Orthodox Church or monastery where monks and priests prayed. the monastery was built on a small hill beside a field and the kavtura river about 2 kilometres away from Tsinarekhi. A watchtower entrance with a large wooden door was built in the front with a wall going around the monastery, behind the entrance is another watchtower and a small basement entrance on the left side for the watchtower. the inside of the main building was painted depicting Georgian christian saints and a graveyard was built beside the building.

See also 
Nikita Magaloff
Simon Magalashvili, Israeli Olympic judoka

References

External links
 

Georgian-language surnames
Noble families of Georgia (country)
Russian noble families